Loepa is a genus of moths in the family Saturniidae.

Species
The genus includes the following species:

 Loepa anthera Jordan, 1911
 Loepa baliensis Paukstadt & Paukstadt, 2010
 Loepa cynopis Naessig & Suhardjono, 1989
 Loepa damartis Jordan, 1911
 Loepa diehli Brechlin, 2010
 Loepa diffundata Brechlin, 2009
 Loepa diffunoccidentalis Brechlin, 2010
 Loepa diffunorientalis Brechlin, 2010
 Loepa diversiocellata Bryk, 1944
 Loepa finnackermanni Brechlin, 2010
 Loepa formosensis Mell, 1939
 Loepa hayatiae Paukstadt & Brechlin, 2011
 Loepa katinka Westwood, 1848
 Loepa kuangtungensis Mell, 1939
 Loepa lampei Paukstadt, Paukstadt & Brechlin, 2011
 Loepa martinii Brechlin & Paukstadt, 2010
 Loepa megacore Jordan, 1911
 Loepa meyi Naumann, 2003
 Loepa microocellata Naumann & Kishida, 2001
 Loepa minahassae Mell, 1939
 Loepa mindanaensis Schuessler, 1933
 Loepa miranda Moore, 1865
 Loepa mirandula Yen et al., 2000
 Loepa nepalensis Brechlin, 2010
 Loepa nigropupillata Naessig & Treadaway, 1997
 Loepa oberthuri (Leech, 1890) (China)
 Loepa obscuromarginata Naumann, 1998
 Loepa orientomiranda Brechlin & Kitching, 2010
 Loepa palawana Naessig & Treadaway, 1997
 Loepa paramiranda Brechlin & Kitching, 2010
 Loepa peggyae Brechlin, 2010
 Loepa roseomarginata Brechlin, 1997
 Loepa schintlmeisteri Brechlin, 2000
 Loepa septentrionalis Mell, 1939
 Loepa siamensis Brechlin, 2010
 Loepa sikkima Moore, 1865
 Loepa sinjaevi Brechlin, 2004
 Loepa sumatrana Naessig, Lampe & Kager, 1989
 Loepa taipeishanis Mell, 1939
 Loepa tibeta Naumann, 2003
 Loepa vanschaycki Brechlin, 2012
 Loepa visayana Brechlin, 2000
 Loepa wlingana Yang, 1978
 Loepa xizangensis Brechlin, 2014
 Loepa yunnana Mell, 1939

External links
 Loepa at funet
 

Saturniinae